KTON (1330 kHz) is a commercial AM radio station broadcasting a sports radio format. Licensed to Cameron, Texas, United States, the station is owned by Milam Broadcasting Company.   KTON simulcasts AM 1660 KRZI in Waco.

Programming is also heard on an FM translator station, 100.9 K265DV in Temple.  KTON and KRZI are ESPN Radio Network affiliates.

Translators

History
At one time, the station was programmed similarly to sister station KCAA in Southern California, with programs including Brother Stair, Alex Jones, Free Talk Live, and Barry W. Lynn.

It used to be licensed as "KMIL," but changed its call sign to "KTAE" on August 1, 2007, and again to "KTON" on December 17, 2012.

KTON is an affiliate of the Dallas Cowboys Radio Network.

References

External links
ESPN Central Texas

TON (AM)
Sports radio stations in the United States